Amthamine is a histamine agonist selective for the H2 subtype. It has been used in vitro and in vivo to study gastric secretion, as well as other functions of the H2 receptor.

References

Histamine agonists
Thiazoles